Reinet may refer to:

 Reinet Investments, a Luxembourg-based investment company
 Graaff Reinet, a town in Eastern Cape province, South Africa